Mordellistena iridescens is a beetle in the genus Mordellistena of the family Mordellidae. It was described in 1897 by Kolbe.

References

iridescens
Beetles described in 1897